Abzaevo (Abzay) is a rural locality (a village) in Kushmanakovsky Selsoviet of Burayevsky District, Bashkortostan, Russia. The population was 156 as of 2010. There are 5 streets.

Geography 
Abzaevo is located 17 km west of Burayevo (the district's administrative centre) by road. Karatamak is the nearest rural locality.

Ethnicity 
The village is inhabited by Bashkirs and others.

References 

Rural localities in Burayevsky District